Hector Borla (May 6, 1937 – January 11, 2002) he was an Argentinean painter and illustrator. Born in Esperanza, Santa Fe, Argentina, he obtained notoriety with his series of oil paintings devoted to Butterflies, Postal-stamps, Henry VIII Wives and exhibited in Buenos Aires, London, Dallas, México and Miami.

He died in Buenos Aires, Argentina.

In tribute, the museum of art in his native city of Esperanza was renamed Hector Borla.

References

External links 
 Bio in Spanish
 Obituary  La Nacion
 Official Infor

People from Esperanza, Santa Fe
2002 deaths
1937 births
20th-century Argentine painters
20th-century Argentine male artists
Argentine male painters